Abdirizak Mohamud Abubakar (born in 1937 – died in 1997 in Salt Lake City, Utah) was one of the first Somali teachers in Galkayo School along with his uncle Abdullah Abubakar.  Abdirizak Mohamud Abubakar educated many Somali students in both Italian Somaliland and British Somaliland in 1950s.

Early years 
Abdirizak Mohamud Abubakar graduated from civilian universities in Egypt in 1959 and military academy in Egypt before he joined the nascent Somali Military in 1960.

Somali Revolution 
Capitan Abdirizak Mohamud Abubakar,  became one of the most admired officers for his integrity and service in 1960s.  He was selected by the commanding officers to be part of the Supreme Revolutionary Council in 1969 along with his seniors Muhammad Ali Samatar, Abdullah Mohamed Fadil and others under the leadership of the Chief Commanding Officer Siad Barre.  His efforts aided Somalia's forces defeat the Ethiopian Army in 1977 under the leadership of General Muhammad Ali Samatar and his subordinates.

The Ogaden Campaign was part of a broader effort to unite all of the Somali-inhabited territories in the Horn region into a Greater Somalia (Soomaaliweyn).[9]

Contributions to Ogaden War 
Abdirizak Mohamud Abubakar  was an instrumental figure in creating and gathering international support for Somalia's effort to peacefully unite Somali people.  He campaigned within Africa and the Arab World.

Abubakar's efforts aided Somalia's forces defeat the Ethiopian Army in 1977 under the leadership of General Muhammad Ali Samatar and his subordinates.  The Ogaden Campaign was part of a broader effort to unite all of the Somali-inhabited territories in the Horn region into a Greater Somalia (Soomaaliweyn).[9]

References

1937 births
1997 deaths
Somalian military leaders
People from Salt Lake City